Vitali Kuznetsov may refer to:
 Vitali Kuznetsov (judoka), Soviet wrestler, silver olympic medalist in judo
 Vitali Kuznetsov (footballer), Russian footballer